Sweaty Nipples were an American rock band from Portland, Oregon. The band released two albums before splitting up. Their music has been characterized as "funk metal".

History
The band formed in Portland in 1987. Band members included Davey Nipples (guitar, bass), Bradley Mowen (drums), Brian Lehfeldt (vocals, drums), Eric French (bass), Dave Merrick (vocals, samples), and  Ryan Moore (guitar). They released the album Straight Outta Portland in 1989. The band recorded a second album in 1991 but record label NastyMix filing for bankruptcy meant that it was not released. Building up a reputation from their live shows, the band won Portland Music Awards in 1991 for Best Alternative/Metal Act and in 1992 for Best Live Show. They played on the Lollapalooza tour in 1992.  With new members Scott Heard (vocals, guitar) and Hans Wagner (drums), the band signed with Megaforce in 1993, and released a self-titled EP followed by the album Bug Harvest, which sold more than 30,000 copies.

With Megaforce's demise, the band signed with Elemental and released the album Thrill Crazed Space Kids Blasting the Flesh Off Humans in 1996.

The band's music was featured in some of the 'Play It Loud' advertisements for Nintendo products in the early 1990s.

Discography

Albums
Straight Outta Portland (1989), Media Blitz
Bug Harvest (1994), Megaforce
Thrill Crazed Space Kids Blasting the Flesh Off Humans (1996), Elemental

EPs
"What's Your Funktion?" (1989) 
Sweaty Nipples (1993), Megaforce

Singles
"Chickensnake" (1991), Tim/Kerr

References

American funk metal musical groups
Heavy metal musical groups from Oregon
Musical groups from Portland, Oregon
1987 establishments in Oregon
Musical groups established in 1987